The 4th European Athletics Championships were held from 23 August to 27 August 1950 in the Heysel Stadium of the Belgian capital Brussels.  Contemporaneous reports on the event were given in the Glasgow Herald.

Men's results
Complete results were published.

Track

Field

Women's results

Track

Field

Medal table

Participation
According to an unofficial count, 454 athletes from 21 countries participated in the event, in agreement with the official number of athletes, but three countries less than the official number of 24 as published.

 (11)
 (48)
 (15)
 (10)
 (20)
 (56)
 (12)
 (10)
 (33)
 (5)
 (21)
 (17)
 (3)
 (3)
 (34)
 Spain (2)
 (38)
 (19)
 (10)
 (48)
 (39)

References

Results

External links 
 EAA
 Athletix

 
European Athletics Championships
European Athletics Championships
Cross
European Athletics Championships
Athletics Championships
Sports competitions in Brussels
1950s in Brussels
August 1950 sports events in Europe